The boys' singles event at the 2007 Sony Ericsson Open was won by Kei Nishikori of Japan.

Seeds
All seeds receive a bye into the second round.

Draw

Finals

External links
Draw

2007 Sony Ericsson Open